Sara Macliver is an Australian soprano singer, born and raised in Perth, Western Australia. Macliver is a versatile artist, appearing in operas, concert and recital performances and on numerous recordings. She is regarded as one of the leading exponents of Baroque repertoire in Australia, and lectures in Voice at the UWA Conservatorium of Music.

She trained in Perth, where she was a pupil of Molly McGurk and was a Young Artist with the West Australian Opera Company. Her roles for the company have included Micaela (Carmen), Papagena (The Magic Flute), Giannetta (L'elisir d'amore), Morgana (Alcina), Ida (Die Fledermaus), Nannetta (Falstaff) and Vespetta (Pimpinone). In 2007, she created the roles of Echo/Aphrodite in Richard Mills' opera The Love of the Nightingale. She sang Susanna in The Marriage of Figaro with the company in 2009.

Sara Macliver regularly performs with Symphony Australia Orchestras, Musica Viva, Melbourne Chorale, the Australian Chamber Orchestra, the Australia Bach Ensemble and Sydney Philharmonia Choirs. She has a particular association with the Australian Brandenburg Orchestra, with whom she recorded her first CD, If Love’s a Sweet Passion, which was a finalist for the Australian Record Industry Association (ARIA) Award for Best Classical Release in 2000.

She has performed in Japan, Italy, New Zealand and Hong Kong. She has performed with Pinchgut Opera in The Fairy-Queen, toured with Musica Viva, Australia Bach Ensemble and worked with Richard Egarr on Joseph Haydn's The Creation in Perth. Other projects include a program based on the life of Jane Austen, with pianist Bernadette Balkus and Musica Viva. She also appeared in Pinchgut Opera's production of Monteverdi's L'Orfeo to great critical acclaim.

Sara Macliver has made a number of recordings for ABC Classics including Gabriel Fauré's Requiem and The Birth of Venus, Carl Orff's Carmina Burana, the title track for a trilogy of Christmas albums and a CD of Haydn arias with the Tasmanian Symphony Orchestra conducted by Ola Rudner. In 2002, she completed a recording of Handel's Messiah for a joint ABC Classics and ABC Television production. This has been released on CD and DVD, and screened several times on national television. ABC Classics have released a disc of Bach arias and duets with Sara Macliver and mezzo-soprano Sally-Anne Russell and the Orchestra of the Antipodes conducted by Antony Walker. This quickly became a best seller and was nominated for an ARIA award. This was followed by a disc of the Pergolesi Stabat Mater (ABC Classics) and other baroque duets, which won the inaugural ABC Classic FM listener’s choice award in 2005. She also appeared in Pinchgut Opera's production of Charpentier's David et Jonathas H.490 in 2009.

She has received an Honorary Doctorate of Music from the University of Western Australia, in whose School of Music she completed her undergraduate studies.

Although resident for some years in Sydney, she has now returned to Perth.

Selected recordings
 Bach Arias and Duets with Sally-Anne Russell (2003) – No. 88 Australia
 Marc-Antoine Charpentier: David + Jonathan H.490, Anders J. Dahlin (David), Sara Macliver (Jonathan), Dean Robinson (Saul), Paul Mcmahon (La Pythonisse), Richard Anderson (Achis), David Parkin (Ghost of Samuel), Simon Lobelson (Joabel) ; Pinchgut Opera, Orchestra of the Antipodes & Cantillation conducted by Antony Walker, (2 CD ABC Classics, cat. 4763691) 2009.

Awards and nominations

ARIA Music Awards
The ARIA Music Awards is an annual awards ceremony that recognises excellence, innovation, and achievement across all genres of Australian music. They commenced in 1987. 

! 
|-
| 1999
| If Love's a Sweet Passion (with Australian Brandenburg Orchestra & Paul Dyer)
|rowspan="3" | Best Classical Album
| 
|rowspan="3" | 
|-
| 2004
| Bach Arias and Duets (with Sally-Anne Russell)
| 
|-
| 2005
| Baroque Duets (with Sally-Anne Russell)
| 
|-

References

External links
Sara Macliver website
Naxos website
Post Newspapers interview

ARIA Award winners
Australian operatic sopranos
Musicians from Perth, Western Australia
University of Western Australia alumni
Living people
Year of birth missing (living people)
21st-century Australian women opera singers